is the third single of Hello! Project subgroup Tanpopo. It was released on June 16, 1999 as an 8 cm CD. It reached number ten on the Japan Oricon charts. Unlike other Tanpopo singles, the song was first featured in Tanpopo 1 before it was released as a single.

Former Tanpopo member, Aya Ishiguro, reunited with the group's 2nd Generation to sing the Grand Symphonic version of the song. This new version, along with the single version, was featured in the group's second album, All of Tanpopo. It was also featured as the ending theme song for the variety show Warau Inu no Bouken: YARANEVA!!.

Track listing 
The lyricist and composer of the songs is Tsunku. The arranger of "Tanpopo" was Takao Konishi, while Kaoru Yamauchi arranged the b-side song.
 "Tanpopo"
 "A Rainy Day"
 "Tanpopo (Instrumental)"

Members at the time of single 
 Aya Ishiguro (石黒彩)
 Kaori Iida (飯田圭織)
 Mari Yaguchi (矢口真里)

Musical Personnel

Tanpopo 
 Aya Ishiguro - vocals
 Kaori Iida - vocals
 Mari Yaguchi - vocals
 Beijing Love Band - strings
 Go Katsuura (勝浦剛) - manipulator
 Takao Konishi (小西貴雄) - keyboards & programming
 Takashi Masuzaki (増崎孝司) - guitar

A Rainy Day 
 Aya Ishiguro - vocals
 Kaori Iida - vocals
 Mari Yaguchi - vocals
 Tsuyoshi Nishida (ニシダツヨシ) - guitar
 Kaoru Yamauchi (山内薫) - bass, keyboards, & programming

External links 
  entry at Hello! Project Official Website
 Tanpopo Up-Front Works
 Projecthello.com: Tanpopo lyrics, A Rainy Day lyrics

Tanpopo songs
1999 singles
Japanese-language songs
Songs written by Tsunku
Song recordings produced by Tsunku
1999 songs
Torch songs
Pop ballads
1990s ballads
Zetima Records singles